Bette Westera (born 20 June 1958) is a Dutch children's writer. She has won numerous awards for her work.

Career 

Westera made her debut as children's book author in 1999 with the book Wil je met me trouwen? Westera went on to win numerous awards for her work, including the Gouden Griffel and the Woutertje Pieterse Prijs in 2015 for her poetry collection Doodgewoon (with illustrations by Sylvia Weve). The previous time a poetry collection won the Gouden Griffel award was twenty years prior in 1995 (Ted van Lieshout's Begin een torentje van niks).

She also won several Zilveren Griffel awards as well as several Vlag en Wimpel awards over the years.

Westera's books have been illustrated by many illustrators, including Annemarie van Haeringen, Barbara de Wolf, Harmen van Straaten, Yvonne Jagtenberg and Sylvia Weve.

Awards 

 2001: Vlag en Wimpel, Een opa om nooit te vergeten
 2003: Vlag en Wimpel, Alle hens aan dek
 2006: Vlag en Wimpel, Oma´s rommelkamer
 2011: Zilveren Griffel, Ik leer je liedjes van verlangen, en aan je apenstaartje hangen
 2013: Vlag en Wimpel, Aan de kant, ik ben je oma niet! (with Sylvia Weve)
 2013: Vlag en Wimpel, Dat zou ik nooit doen! (with Naomi Tieman and Sylvia Weve)
 2014: Zilveren Griffel, Held op sokken
 2015: Woutertje Pieterse Prijs, Doodgewoon (with Sylvia Weve)
 2015: Gouden Griffel, Doodgewoon
 2015: Vlag en Wimpel, Kietel nooit een krokodil
 2016: Vlag en Wimpel, In een slootje ben ik een bootje
 2017: Zilveren Griffel, Baby'tje in mama's buik
 2018: Zilveren Griffel, Was de aarde vroeger plat? (with Sylvia Weve)
 2018: Vlag en Wimpel, Dag poes! (with Koos Meinderts, Sjoerd Kuyper, Hans Hagen and Monique Hagen)
 2020: Woutertje Pieterse Prijs, Uit elkaar (with Sylvia Weve)
 2020: Boekenleeuw, Uit elkaar

References

External links 

 Bette Westera (in Dutch), Digital Library for Dutch Literature

1958 births
Living people
20th-century Dutch women writers
21st-century Dutch women writers
Woutertje Pieterse Prize winners
Gouden Griffel winners